Clifton Historic District is a national historic district located at Clifton, Fairfax County, Virginia.  It encompasses 62 contributing buildings, 1 contributing site, and 1 contributing object in the town of Clifton.  They include 53 residences, 3 churches, 4 commercial buildings, and 2 local government buildings mostly built between 1880 and 1910. Notable buildings include the Clifton Presbyterian Church (1871), Clifton Baptist Church (1912), Clifton Hotel (1869), the Mayhugh Tavern (c. 1870), the Ford House (c. 1880), the Cross House (c. 1886), Buckley Brothers Store (c. 1900), the M. M. Payne House (1903), and "Red Gables" (1908).

It was listed on the National Register of Historic Places in 1985.

References

Historic districts in Fairfax County, Virginia
Second Empire architecture in Virginia
National Register of Historic Places in Fairfax County, Virginia
Historic districts on the National Register of Historic Places in Virginia